Whyteman's Brae Hospital is a health facility in Whyteman's Brae, Kirkcaldy, Scotland. It is managed by NHS Fife.

History 
The facility, which provides psychiatry and services for elderly patients, was completed in 1983. A serious outbreak of diarrhea and vomiting, in which three people died, occurred at the hospital in October 2002. In 2018 the hospital started to make the hospital safer by removing sink pipes, door closers and shower taps.

References 

Hospitals in Fife
NHS Scotland hospitals
1983 establishments in Scotland
Hospitals established in 1983
Hospital buildings completed in 1983